Notes from the Underworld is the major label debut of Oakland electronic pop group Persephone's Bees.

Track listing
 "Way to Your Heart" – 2:59
 "Climbing" – 3:07
 "City of Love" – 4:04
 "Nice Day" – 4:01
 "Muzika Dlya Fil'ma" – 5:43
 "Even Though I'm Fooling Around" – 3:03
 "On the Earth" – 3:08
 "Walk to the Moon" – 3:56
 "Paper Plane" – 3:33
 "Queen's Night Out" – 4:27
 "Home" – 6:50

References

Notes from the Underworld
Notes from the Underworld
Albums produced by Eric Valentine
Columbia Records albums